Thomas Creek Bridge crosses Thomas Creek in Curry County, in the U.S. state of Oregon. It is on U.S. Route 101 and lies within the boundaries of Samuel H. Boardman State Scenic Corridor.

It is a Warren deck truss designed by Ivan D. Merchant.

See also
 
 
 
 List of bridges in the United States by height
 List of bridges on U.S. Route 101 in Oregon

References

External links
 Thomas Creek Bridge at bridgehunter.com
 Thomas Creek Bridge at highestbridges.com

Transportation buildings and structures in Curry County, Oregon
Road bridges in Oregon
U.S. Route 101
Bridges of the United States Numbered Highway System
1961 establishments in Oregon
Warren truss bridges in the United States